Meesapulimala is an Indian peak, the next south of the second highest peak (Manna Malai ) of the Western Ghats on the border of Idukki district, Kerala state.
The name derives from its appearance from the southwest of a leopard with prominent whiskers (meesa - moustache; puli - leopard; mala - hill/mountain). It is located in between the Anaimalai Hills and Palani Hills near Suryanelli around 20 km away from Munnar. The Kolukkumalai tea estate, Top Station and Tipadamala (2135 m) is also nearby.

Treks to the peak via Rhodo Valley (favourable for rhododendron flowers) can be organized through the Kerala Forest Development Corporation in Munnar. The trekking path from Kolukkumalai to Meesapulimala is highly restricted.

Wildlife including the Nilgiri tahr, sambar deer, wild gaur, wild dogs and even the sloth bear.

Citations

External links
Meesapulimala Trekking Package Tour details 

Mountains of Tamil Nadu
Mountains of Kerala
Mountains of the Western Ghats
Geography of Idukki district
Two-thousanders of Asia